William Herman Pietsch (March 5, 1935 – July 15, 2004) was an American businessman and politician.

Early life and education 
Pietsch was born in Casselton, North Dakota and graduated from Lincoln High School in Casselton. He received Bachelor of Arts and Master of Arts degrees from North Dakota State University and his doctorate from the Washington State University. He also attended the University of North Dakota.

Career 
Pietsch worked as a business consultant and served in the North Dakota Air National Guard. He served in the North Dakota House of Representatives from 2000 until his resignation on December 16, 2002, because of health problems. He was a Republican.

Personal life 
His wife, Vonnie, also served in the North Dakota Legislative Assembly. Pietsch died at the Elm Care Center in Fargo, North Dakota, from a series of strokes.

References

External links

1935 births
2004 deaths
People from Cass County, North Dakota
North Dakota National Guard personnel
University of North Dakota alumni
North Dakota State University alumni
Washington State University alumni
Businesspeople from North Dakota
Republican Party members of the North Dakota House of Representatives
20th-century American politicians
21st-century American politicians
20th-century American businesspeople